Armadillo repeat containing X-linked 6 is a protein that in humans is encoded by the ARMCX6 gene located on the X-chromosome.

It is one of six armadillo repeats containing X-linked proteins (ARMCX1, ARMCX2, ARMCX3, ARMCX4, ARMCX5, and ARMCX6 (this protein)).

The function of this protein is unknown at this time.

Protein sequence

     1 MGRAREVGWM AAGLMIGAGA CYCVYKLTIG RDDSEKLEEE 
    41 GEEEWDDDQE LDEEEPDIWF DFETMARPWT EDGDWTEPGA 
    81 PGGTEDRPSG GGKANRAHPI KQRPFPYEHK NTWSAQNCKN 
   121 GSCVLDLSKC LFIQGKLLFA EPKDAGFPFS QDINSHLASL 
   161 SMARNTSPTP DPTVREALCA PDNLNASIES QGQIKMYINE 
   201 VCRETVSRCC NSFLQQAGLN LLISMTVINN MLAKSASDLK 
   241 FPLISEGSGC AKVQVLKPLM GLSEKPVLAG ELVGAQMLFS 
   301 FMSLFIRNGN REILLETPAP

Homology

ARMCX6 is conserved in many eukaryotic organisms.

Orthologs

Secondary Structure 
The secondary structure of ARMCX6 is predicted to be similar to cyanase.  A comparison of the two sequences is shown below.
                          10        20        30        40
                ....*....|....*....|....*....|....*....|....*..
ARMCX6      231 MLAKSASDLKFPLISEGSGCAKVQVLKPLMGLSEKPVLAGELVGAQM 277
1DW9_A       19 LLSKAKKDLSFAEIADGTGLAEAFVTAALLGQQALPADAARLVGAKL 65
                 + +   ++ +  +  + + +   +   + +    +  +  ++++

Expression 
Microarray data show that ARMCX6 is highly expressed during earliest stages of spermatogenesis in mice.

References

External links

Further reading

Armadillo-repeat-containing proteins